New English is the debut mixtape by American rapper Desiigner. It was released on June 26, 2016, by GOOD Music and Def Jam Recordings. New English features guest appearances from Pusha T, King Savage and Mekado. The mixtape's lead single: "Panda" was released on December 15, 2015. In April 2016, that single reached the top of the US Billboard Hot 100.

Background 
On April 12, 2016, in an interview with Billboard, Desiigner first announced that the title of the mixtape would be called Trap History Month. However, the mixtape was formally announced on June 22, 2016, with the new title to the mixtape called New English, when he premiered it at a Tidal-sponsored listening party in New York City. Although no release date was provided at that time, Desiigner released the mixtape just four days later, exclusively through Tidal's streaming service. It was later released into the iTunes Store and Spotify later that day. The tracks were eventually uploaded to YouTube.

Singles 
The debut single from the mixtape, "Panda", was released on December 15, 2015. The track was produced by Menace. In April 2016, that single reached the top of the US Billboard Hot 100.

Reception 

The mixtape received mixed reviews from music critics. The mixtape was praised for its production but criticized for its lack of originality, unfinished nature and Desiigner's own performance on the project. Matthew Ramirez of Pitchfork said about the album, "It sounds like the last five years of hip-hop watered down."

Commercial performance
In the United States, New English debuted at number 22 on the Billboard 200, with 13 million streams of its songs, which account for 56% of the 16,000 album-equivalent units according to Billboard.

Track listing

Notes
 signifies a co-producer

Sample credits
"Caliber" contains a sample of "Think (About It)" performed by Lyn Collins.

Charts

References

2016 mixtape albums
Desiigner albums